Time to Come is an anthology of science fiction and fantasy stories edited by American writer August Derleth.  It was first published by Farrar, Straus and Young in 1954.  The stories are all original to this anthology.

Contents

 Foreword, by August Derleth
 "Butch", by Poul Anderson
 "The Pause", by Isaac Asimov
 "Keeper of the Dream", by Charles Beaumont
 "No Morning After", by Arthur C. Clarke
 "The Blight", by Arthur J. Cox
 "Hole in the Sky", by Irving Cox, Jr.
 "Jon’s World", by Philip K. Dick
 "The White Pinnacle", by Carl Jacobi
 "Winner Take All", by Ross Rocklynne
 "Paradise II", by Robert Sheckley
 "Phoenix", by Clark Ashton Smith
 "BAXBR/DAXBR", by Evelyn E. Smith

Sources

1954 anthologies
Science fiction anthologies
Fantasy anthologies
Farrar, Straus and Giroux books